The Hillside Avenue Historic District of Medford, Massachusetts encompasses a well-preserved late 19th-century residential subdivision.  It consists of fifteen properties on Hillside and Grand View Avenues, near the downtown area of the city.  Most of the houses in the district are Queen Anne Victorians, built in the 1890s; there are a number of Colonial Revival, Tudor, and Shingle style homes, all dating in construction between 1875 and 1895.  Of particular note is the Bela Warner house at 35 Hillside Avenue, a dramatically sited Shingle style house built 1881–82.

The district was listed on the National Register of Historic Places in 1975.

See also
National Register of Historic Places listings in Medford, Massachusetts
National Register of Historic Places listings in Middlesex County, Massachusetts

References

Historic districts in Middlesex County, Massachusetts
Medford, Massachusetts
National Register of Historic Places in Medford, Massachusetts
Historic districts on the National Register of Historic Places in Massachusetts